Denis Gargaud Chanut (born 22 July 1987) is a French slalom canoeist who has competed at the international level in C1 since 2004. Between 2009 and 2011 he also competed in the C2 category alongside Fabien Lefèvre. He won a gold medal in the C1 event at the 2016 Summer Olympics in Rio de Janeiro.

Gargaud Chanut also won nine medals at the ICF Canoe Slalom World Championships with four golds (C1: 2011, C1 team: 2021, C2 team: 2010, 2011), three silvers (C1 team: 2009, C2: 2010, 2011) and two bronzes (C1 team: 2013, 2017). He won nine medals at the European Championships (three golds, two silvers and four bronzes).

Gargaud Chanut finished the 2011 season as the World No. 1 in the C1 event. He won the overall World Cup title in C1 in 2021.

Denis's aunt and uncle, Pierre and Cathy Chassigneux, were French champions in the mixed C2 category and run a canoe-kayak club on the Loire river in Orléans; Denis took up canoeing there aged 12. He later excelled internationally, but failed to qualify for the 2008 and 2012 Olympics due to a strong competition with Tony Estanguet, and considered retiring.

Denis is the founder and head of the Duo Tonic and Mulebar company, which produces bars drinks and energy gels for athletes.

World Cup individual podiums

References

External links

12 September 2009 final results of the men's C1 team slalom event for the 2009 ICF Canoe Slalom World Championships. – accessed 12 September 2009.
2010 ICF Canoe Slalom World Championships 11 September 2010 C2 men's final results – accessed 11 September 2010.
2010 ICF Canoe Slalom World Championships 11 September 2010 C2 men's team final results. – accessed 11 September 2010.

French male canoeists
Living people
Canoeists at the 2016 Summer Olympics
Olympic canoeists of France
Olympic gold medalists for France
Olympic medalists in canoeing
Medalists at the 2016 Summer Olympics
1987 births
Medalists at the ICF Canoe Slalom World Championships
Sportspeople from Marseille
21st-century French people